At the 1998 FIFA World Cup, the 32 teams were divided into eight groups of four, labelled A–H. Group C was composed of Saudi Arabia, South Africa, Denmark and host nation and eventual world champion France.

Denmark and France started well, defeating Saudi Arabia and South Africa respectively. Next, France scored four to eliminate Saudi Arabia and qualify with a match to spare, while Denmark and South Africa drew. Needing a big win in their final game, against Saudi Arabia, South Africa conceded two penalties and could only draw, so Denmark still qualified despite losing their final game to France.

Standings

France advanced to play Paraguay (runner-up of Group D) in the round of 16.
Denmark advanced to play Nigeria (winner of Group D) in the round of 16.

Matches

Saudi Arabia vs Denmark

France vs South Africa

South Africa vs Denmark

France vs Saudi Arabia
Mohammed Al-Khilaiwi was sent off in the 19th minute after tripping Bixente Lizarazu from behind. Zinedine Zidane was ejected at the 71st minute when he appeared to plant his studs into the side of Saudi captain Fuad Anwar after they collided going for a ball.

France vs Denmark

South Africa vs Saudi Arabia

References

Group C
Group
South Africa at the 1998 FIFA World Cup
Saudi Arabia at the 1998 FIFA World Cup
Group